Rajampalem is a village in Pedavegi mandal in the Indian state of Andhra Pradesh.

Demographics 

 Census of India, Rajampalem had a population of 10. The total population constitute, 7 males and 3 females with a sex ratio of 3 females per 1000 males. 0 children are in the age group of 0–6 years, with sex ratio of 0 The average literacy rate stands at 90.00%.

References

Villages in Eluru district